Tom Van Mol (born 12 October 1972) is a Belgian former professional footballer as a defender.

Career
Van Mol started playing football for his local team, Sparta Buggenhout. Only one year later, he moved to the youth teams of Anderlecht. He never managed to break through there and in 1991, Van Mol was transferred to PSV. He played 9 times for PSV that season, and one year later he moved on to Sparta. This was the first team where Van Mol would obtain a place in the starting eleven. As a result, Tom Van Mol regained the interest of PSV, where he would also manage to break through in the 1993–94 season, appearing 39 times for PSV, scoring once. Nevertheless, in the next season Van Mol would return to Belgium, playing for Lommel SK. This only lasted for two seasons. Van Mol was transferred to FC Utrecht where he would stay from 1997 until 2004. From 2004 he played for the Belgian Cercle Brugge. On 6 May 2008, it was announced that he had signed a contract with third-tier club FCN Sint-Niklaas.

After retiring, he has worked for a clothing company and done scouting work for Anderlecht.

References

External links
 Tom Van Mol player info at the official Cercle Brugge site 
 Cerclemuseum.be 

Living people
1972 births
Belgian footballers
Cercle Brugge K.S.V. players
PSV Eindhoven players
FC Utrecht players
Sparta Rotterdam players
Association football defenders
Belgian Pro League players
Belgian Third Division players
Eredivisie players
Belgian expatriate footballers
Expatriate footballers in the Netherlands
Belgian expatriate sportspeople in the Netherlands
K.F.C. Lommel S.K. players
Sportkring Sint-Niklaas players
People from Dendermonde
Footballers from East Flanders